Jane Fraser (born 1967) is a British-American banking executive and the chief executive (CEO) of Citigroup, a position she has held since March 2021. Educated at Girton College, Cambridge, and Harvard Business School, she was a partner at McKinsey & Company for 10 years before joining Citigroup in 2004. In 2019, she was named president of Citigroup, and also CEO of Consumer Banking.

In September 2020, Citigroup announced that she would replace Michael Corbat as CEO of Citigroup Inc. in February 2021, becoming the first woman to head a major U.S. bank. She was included on Fortune "Most Powerful Women in Business" list in 2014 and 2015 and has been called the "Number 1 Woman to Watch" for two consecutive years by American Banker.

Early life and education
Jane Fraser was born in St Andrews, Scotland. She attended Girton College, Cambridge, from 1985 to 1988, graduating with an BA (promoted to a MA per tradition) in economics. 

After graduation, she worked as a mergers and acquisitions analyst at Goldman Sachs, London, from July 1988 to July 1990, then as a brokerage associate for Asesores Bursátiles, a Madrid-based securities broker, from August 1990 to June 1992. In 1992 she enrolled at Harvard Business School, earning her MBA in 1994.

McKinsey & Company

In 1994 she joined McKinsey & Company, working in financial services and global strategy, eventually rising to partner. For the first six years she worked in New York, and for the last four years in London. She worked part-time while raising her young children.

She wrote articles on globalization and was a co-author, with three other McKinsey employees, of the 1999 book Race for the World: Strategies to Build a Great Global Firm. As part of her research for the book, she traveled to China, Hong Kong, Indonesia, Singapore, and India to interview McKinsey clients about their global challenges. After hearing her speak about the book, Citigroup executive Michael Klein spent several years encouraging Fraser to make the move to Citigroup, which she eventually did in 2004.

Citigroup
Fraser was hired as Head of Client Strategy in Citigroup's investment and global banking division in July 2004. In October 2007 she was promoted to Global Head of Strategy and Mergers and Acquisitions, a position she held until May 2009. Her tenure as Global Head coincided with the financial crisis of 2007–2009, and she was part of the executive team that was "charged with restructuring the group, leading its re-engineering effort, making divestments and raising new capital".

In June 2009 she was named CEO of Citi Private Bank. At the time of her promotion, the bank was running an annual deficit of approximately $250 million; it returned to the black during her four-year tenure. Among the changes she implemented were a decrease in the ratio of private bankers to clients, with a target of one banker for every 30 clients, and the removal of commissions and sales formulas for bankers in favor of a year-end discretionary bonus.

In May 2013 she was asked to replace the retiring CEO of CitiMortgage. Though she knew the move was a career risk, she accepted the challenge. Her stewardship of Citigroup's mortgage division coincided with the marketwide drop in demand for mortgage refinancing, forcing the bank to refocus its efforts on selling residential mortgages to home buyers. Citigroup closed several mortgage offices nationwide and laid off 1,000 employees in September 2013 alone.

Less than a year later, in March 2014, Fraser was promoted to CEO of US Consumer and Commercial Banking, succeeding Cecelia Stewart who announced her retirement. And in April 2015 she was named CEO of Citigroup Latin America, with responsibility for operations in 24 countries. The latter promotion followed a reshuffling of Citigroup executives sparked by the retirement of Manuel Medina-Mora, CEO of Citigroup's global consumer bank. Medina-Mora was replaced by Stephen Bird, former CEO for the Asia-Pacific region, who in turn was replaced by Francisco Aristeguieta, former CEO of Citigroup Latin America. While based in Miami, Fraser has been tasked with, among other things, "instilling a more U.S.-like culture" at Banamex (Banco Nacional de México), owned and operated by Citigroup since 2001. The bank was fined $2.2 million on fraud charges in 2014. The head of Banamex, Ernesto Torres Cantu, reports directly to Fraser.

In October 2019, Fraser was appointed President of Citigroup and Head of Global Consumer Banking (GCB), and was responsible for all of Citi’s Consumer businesses, including Retail Banking and Wealth Management, Credit Cards, Mortgage and Operations and Technology in 19 markets.

Promotion to CEO and tenure

In September 2020, Citigroup announced its CEO, Michael Corbat's retirement, to be effective in February 2021. Fraser was appointed to succeed Corbat, becoming the first female CEO of a top-tier Wall Street Investment Bank, leading the third-largest bank in the U.S.
Fraser has taken an approach to work during the Covid-19 pandemic that differs from peer CEOs, instituting permanent plans to allow staff to work from home some days of the week, and granting staff greater flexibility in their schedules than other Wall Street firms. She has cited differentiating Citigroup from other bulge bracket banks such as Goldman Sachs and JPMorgan Chase during recruiting as a motivation for this approach.

Fraser is scheduled to speak at the November 2022 Global Financial Leaders' Investment Summit, with the Hong Kong Democracy Council claiming that her presence, along with other financial executives, legitimizes the Hong Kong government's whitewashing of the erosion of freedoms in the city.

Memberships
Fraser is Vice Chair for Partnership for New York City and a member of the Harvard Business School’s Board of Dean’s Advisors, the Stanford Global Advisory Board, the Economic Club of New York and the Council on Foreign Relations. Fraser has led the Citi Operations team since 2021. She was also a member of the board of the Touch Foundation from 2006 to 2015.

Honours and recognition
In 2015 Fraser was ranked number 41 on Fortune list of the 51 Most Powerful Women in Business, up from number 48 on the 2014 list. American Banker named her the "Number 1 Woman to Watch" both in 2014 and 2015.

Fraser was selected for the inaugural 2021 Forbes 50 Over 50; made up of entrepreneurs, leaders, scientists and creators who are over the age of 50.

Personal
Fraser is married and the mother of two sons. Her husband, a native of Cuba, left his job as a bank manager in Europe during the financial crisis of 2008 to spend more time caring for their young children. In June 2015 Fraser appeared on a CBS Local report about Citi Global Community Day, in which she and other volunteers spruced up the Liberty Square public housing project in Miami.

In April 2021, during her first televised interview as CEO of Citigroup (on CNBC), Fraser disclosed that despite the [British] accent, she had "been a proud American [citizen] for the last twenty years".

In May 26, 2021, during a congressional testimony before the United States Senate Committee on Banking, Housing, and Urban Affairs, Fraser noted in her opening remarks as CEO of Citigroup, that she first arrived in the United States in 1987, before becoming a U.S. citizen in 2001.

References

Sources

1967 births
Alumni of Girton College, Cambridge
Citigroup employees
Harvard Business School alumni
Living people
McKinsey & Company people
People from St Andrews
American women chief executives